Ogi (or Akamu)  is a fermented cereal pudding and popular street food from Nigeria, typically made from maize, sorghum, or millet. Traditionally, the grains are soaked in water for up to three days, before wet-milling and sieving to remove husks. The filtered cereal is then allowed to ferment for up to three days until sour. It is then boiled into a pap , or cooked to make a creamy pudding also known as Agidi or Eko. It may be eaten with moin moin, akara/acarajé or bread depending on individual choice.

In Kenya the porridge is known as uji (not to be confused with ugali) and is generally made with millet and sorghum. It is commonly served for breakfast and dinner, but often has a thinner gravy-like consistency.

The fermentation of ogi is performed by various lactic acid bacteria including Lactobacillus spp and various yeasts including Saccharomyces and Candida spp.

See also
 Boza - Fermented grain drink 
 Fermentation in food processing
 List of African dishes
 Mageu - African fermented beverage
 Poi - Starchy Polynesian dish that is sometimes fermented
 Pozol - Fermented corn drink from the Americas

References 

Fermented foods
African cuisine
Staple foods
Beninese cuisine
Nigerian cuisine
Yoruba cuisine